Kaluđerović is a Montenegrin surname, derived from kaluđer, meaning "monk". It may refer to:

Andrija Kaluđerović (born 1987), Serbian professional footballer
Nebojša Kaluđerović (born 1955), Montenegrin politician
Nenad Kaluđerović, person who shot and killed the perpetrator of the 2022 Cetinje shooting
Željko Kaluđerović (born 1964), retired Montenegrin goalkeeper

See also
Kaluđerski
Kaluđerčić

Serbian surnames
Montenegrin surnames
Occupational surnames